Pádraigh Griffin (1975 – 22 October 2022) was an Irish Gaelic footballer. At club level he played with Clonakilty and was also a member of the Cork senior football team.

Playing career
Griffin first played Gaelic football at juvenile and underage levels with Clonakilty. He also lined out as a schoolboy with Clonakilty Community College and won an All-Ireland VSFC title with the Cork vocational schools' team in 1994. Griffin first played for Clonakilty at adult level as a member of the junior team. He was a member of the club's senior team that won the Cork SFC title in 1996, before claiming a second winners' medal in 2009.

Griffin's performances at club level earned a call-up to the Cork under-21 team in 1996. He was drafted onto the senior team in 1997. Griffin made a number of appearances in various National League campaigns before being included on the Cork championship team. He also lined out for the junior team.

Personal life and death
His father, Pat Griffin, was a two-time All-Ireland SFC medal-winner with Kerry in 1969 and 1970. Griffin died on 22 October 2022, at the age of 47.

Honours
Clonakilty
Cork Senior Football Championship: 1996, 2003
West Cork Under-21 Football Championship: 1996 (c)

Cork
All-Ireland Vocational Schools Championship: 1994

References

1975 births
2022 deaths
Clonakilty Gaelic footballers
Cork inter-county Gaelic footballers
Irish schoolteachers
UCC Gaelic footballers